Michael VII Doukas or Ducas, nicknamed Parapinakes (lit. "minus a quarter", with reference to the devaluation of the Byzantine currency under his rule), was the senior Byzantine emperor from 1071 to 1078. He was known as incompetent as an emperor and reliant on court officials, especially of his finance minister Nikephoritzes, who increased taxation and luxury spending while not properly financing their army (which later mutinied). Under his reign, Bari was lost and his empire faced open revolt in the Balkans. Along with the advancing Seljuk Turks in the eastern front, Michael also had to contend with his mercenaries openly going against the empire. Michael stepped down as emperor in 1078 where he later retired to a monastery.

Life 

Michael VII was born  1050 in Constantinople, the eldest son of Constantine X Doukas and Eudokia Makrembolitissa. He was probably associated with the throne around the end of 1059, together with or shortly before his newly born brother Konstantios Doukas. When Constantine X died on 23 May 1067, Michael VII was already 17 years old and should have been able to rule by himself. He exhibited little interest in politics, however, and his mother Eudokia and uncle John Doukas governed the empire as effective regents.

On 1 January 1068, Eudokia married the general Romanos IV Diogenes, who now became senior co-emperor alongside Michael VII, Konstantios, and another brother, Andronikos. When Romanos IV was defeated and captured by Alp Arslan of the Seljuk Turks at the Battle of Manzikert in August 1071, Michael VII remained in the background, while the initiative was taken by his uncle John Doukas and his tutor Michael Psellos. They conspired to keep Romanos from regaining power after his release from captivity, while Michael felt no obligation to honor the agreement that Romanos had struck with the Sultan. Michael VII was proclaimed emperor on 1 October 1071, although Eudokia ruled as regent for a month before being dispatched to a monastery.

Although still advised by Michael Psellos and John Doukas, Michael VII became increasingly reliant on his finance minister Nikephoritzes. The emperor's chief interests, shaped by Psellos, were in academic pursuits, and he allowed Nikephoritzes to increase both taxation and luxury spending without properly financing the army. As an emperor he was incompetent, often surrounded by sycophantic court officials. In dire straits, imperial officials resorted to property confiscations and even expropriated some of the wealth of the church. The underpaid army tended to mutiny, and the Byzantines lost Bari, their last possession in Italy, to the Normans of Robert Guiscard in 1071. Simultaneously, they faced a serious revolt under Georgi Voyteh in the Balkans, where they faced an attempt at the restoration of the Bulgarian state.  Although this revolt was suppressed by the general Nikephoros Bryennios, the Byzantine Empire was unable to recover its losses in Asia Minor.

After Manzikert, the Byzantine government sent a new army to contain the Seljuk Turks under Isaac Komnenos, a brother of the future emperor Alexios I Komnenos, but this army was defeated and its commander captured in 1073. The problem was made worse by the desertion of the Byzantines' western mercenaries under Roussel de Bailleul who were setting up an independent principiality in the region of Galatia and Lycaonia. They became the object of the next military expedition in the area, led by Michael's uncle, Caesar John Doukas.  This campaign also ended in failure, and John was likewise captured by the enemy.  The victorious Roussel now forced John Doukas to stand as pretender to the throne and sacked Chrysopolis, just opposite Constantinople. The government of Michael VII was forced to recognize the conquests of the Seljuks in Asia Minor in 1074, and to seek their support.  A new army under Alexios Komnenos (the future emperor), reinforced by Seljuk troops sent by Malik Shah I, finally defeated the mercenaries and captured John Doukas in 1074.

These misfortunes caused widespread dissatisfaction, exacerbated by the devaluation of the currency, which gave the emperor his nickname Parapinakēs. In 1078 two generals, Nikephoros Bryennios and Nikephoros Botaneiates, simultaneously revolted in the Balkans and Anatolia, respectively.  Botaneiates gained the support of the Seljuk Turks, and he reached Constantinople first. Michael VII resigned the throne with hardly a struggle on 24 or 31 March 1078 and retired into the Monastery of Stoudios. He later became metropolitan of Ephesus and died in Constantinople in c. 1090.

Before his resignation from the throne, Michael VII may have sent an embassy to Song China, following a series of Byzantine embassies to the earlier Tang Empire of China. From the Wenxian Tongkao, written by Chinese historian Ma Duanlin (1245–1322), and the 14th century work the History of Song, it is known that the ruler "Mie-li-yi-ling-kai-sa" (滅力伊靈改撒) of Fu-lin (i.e. Byzantium) sent an embassy to the Song dynasty which arrived on November 1081, during the reign of Emperor Shenzong of Song (r. 1067–1085). The History of Song mentions how the Byzantine diplomat and official named "Ni-si-tu-ling-si-meng-p'an" offered saddled horses, sword-blades, and real pearls as tributary gifts to the Song court.

Usurpers
Various usurpers attempted to overthrow Michael VII or rule parts of the empire. These included:

 Nestor – A former slave of Constantine X, Nestor had been promoted to become the dux of Paradounavon, a region bordering the Danube. Having had much of his property and wealth confiscated by the minister Nikephoritzes, he rebelled in around 1076, placing himself at the head of the garrisons under his command, which were already in a state of mutiny due to an arrears in their pay. The troops were eager to plunder the Bulgarians, and Nestor obtained the assistance of one of the chiefs of the Pechenegs before marching onto Constantinople. The rebels demanded the dismissal of Nikephoritzes, but discovering that he didn't have the numbers to attack the capital, Nestor's troops separated into smaller parties and proceeded to plunder Thrace. Defeated by Alexios Komnenos in 1078, Nestor remained with the Pechenegs, and retreated with them back to Paradunavum.
 Philaretos Brachamios
 John Doukas (the Caesar), Michael's uncle
 Nikephoros Bryennios
 Nikephoros Botaneiates

Family
Michael VII Doukas married Maria of Alania, daughter of King Bagrat IV of Georgia.  By her he had at least one son, Constantine Doukas, co-emperor from c. 1075 to 1078 and from 1081 to 1087/8. He died c. 1095.

Gallery

See also

List of Byzantine emperors

Notes

References

Bibliography

 see also 
 
 

 

 

 
 
 

Attribution:

Further reading

Primary sources

External links 
 Coins of Michael VII

11th-century Byzantine emperors
Doukid dynasty
Bishops of Ephesus
11th-century Eastern Orthodox bishops
1050s births
1090s deaths
Monarchs who abdicated
Eastern Orthodox monarchs
Studite monks
1070s in the Byzantine Empire
Sons of Byzantine emperors
1050 births
1090 deaths